A women's advertising club is an association for women who work in advertising.  Such clubs were started in the US and UK in the early twentieth century after women had become established in the profession but were denied entry to male organisations. Some were originally founded by men as a way to entertain their wives during advertising conventions.

History
The Association of Advertising Women was established in London in 1910.  This ceased at the end of the First World War and was followed by the Women's Advertising Club of London in 1923.  The League of Advertising Women was started in New York in 1912 by Christine Frederick and still exists as the Advertising Women of New York. 

Other clubs included the Women's Advertising Club of St. Louis (1916), the Women's Advertising Club of Chicago (1917) and the Women's Advertising Club of Toronto (1933). Other related organisations included the Women's Publicity Club of Boston which was founded in 1911 to campaign for truth in advertising.

References

External links
Online Advertising & Ad Posting

Advertising
Women's organizations